Oh Do-hyun (born 6 December 1994) is a South Korean footballer who plays as defender for Seongnam FC.

Career
He was selected by Gwangju FC in the 2013 K League draft.

On 19 January 2017, Seongnam FC announced Oh Do-hyun as the new signing ahead of 2017 Seongnam FC season.

References

External links 

1994 births
Living people
Association football defenders
South Korean footballers
Gwangju FC players
Seongnam FC players
Pohang Steelers players
K League 1 players
K League 2 players